Armorial of the speakers of the House of Commons is displayed at the House of Commons in the Palace of Westminster. Speakers customarily take a grant of arms while in office, if they are not armigerous already. Their shields of arms are painted on the interior walls of Speaker's House, and after their elevation to the peerage they are displayed on the windows along the peers' staircase in the House of Lords.

Prior to the Acts of Union 1707, John Smith had been Speaker of the House of Commons of England.

Speakers of the House of Commons of Great Britain

Speakers of the House of Commons of the United Kingdom

Speakers in the nineteenth century

Speakers in the twentieth century

Speakers in the twenty-first century

Further reading
 Burke's Peerage & Baronetage
 Debrett's People of Today

References

External links
 College of Arms

Personal armorials
Armorials of the United Kingdom
Speakers of the British House of Commons